Midwest Emmy Awards may refer to the following regional Emmys:

 The Chicago / Midwest Emmy Awards, parts of Illinois, Indiana and Wisconsin
 The Upper Midwest Emmy Awards, encompassing Minnesota, North Dakota, South Dakota; and parts of Nebraska and Wisconsin